Palpomyiini is a tribe of biting midges in the family Ceratopogonidae. There are about 5 genera and more than 610 described species in Palpomyiini.

Genera
These five genera belong to the tribe Palpomyiini:
 Amerohelea Grogan & Wirth, 1981
 Bezzia Kieffer, 1899
 Pachyhelea Wirth, 1959
 Palpomyia Meigen
 Phaenobezzia Haeselbarth, 1965

References

Further reading

External links

 

Ceratopogonidae
Articles created by Qbugbot
nematocera tribes